The Rapid City-Spearfish, SD combined statistical area, as defined by the United States Census Bureau, consists of the Rapid City, SD metropolitan statistical area and Spearfish, SD micropolitan statistical area. Anchored by the city of Rapid City, the area corresponds to the entirety of Pennington, Meade, and Lawrence counties in the state of South Dakota. As of the 2020 census, the CSA had a population of 164,842 (2021 estimate placed the population at  168,144).

Counties
Lawrence
Meade
Pennington

Communities

Places with more than 50,000 inhabitants
Rapid City (Principal city)

Places with 1,000 to 20,000 inhabitants
Blackhawk (census-designated place)
Box Elder 
Colonial Pine Hills (census-designated place)
Deadwood
Ellsworth AFB (census-designated place)
Lead
Rapid Valley (census-designated place)
Spearfish
Sturgis
Summerset

Places with 500 to 1,000 inhabitants
Ashland Heights (census-designated place)
Green Valley (census-designated place)
Hill City
New Underwood
Wall
Whitewood

Places with less than 500 inhabitants
Central City
Faith
Keystone
Piedmont
Quinn
St. Onge
Wasta

Unincorporated places
Caputa
Johnson Siding
Owanka
Rockerville
Scenic
Silver City
Three Forks
Wicksville

Demographics
Note: these statistics pertain to the Rapid City, SD metropolitan statistical area only.

2010
The ethnic makeup of the MSA, according to the 2010 U.S. Census, was the following:
85.26% White
8.19% Native American
1.08% Black
0.96% Asian
>0.01% Native Hawaiian or Pacific Islander
3.63% Two or more races
0.80% Other races
3.63% Hispanic or Latino (of any race)

As of the census of 2010, there were 126,382 people, 51,154
households, and 33,390 families residing in the MSA. The population density was 20.2 people per square mile (7.8/km2). There were 55,949 housing units at an average density of 8.9 per square mile (3.4/km2).  27.9% were of German, 7.2% Irish, 6.7% Norwegian, and 5.2% English ancestry.

There were 51,154 households, out of which 32.0% had children under the age of 18 living with them, 49.2% were married couples living together, 11.2% had a female householder with no husband present, and 34.7% were non-families. 28.0% of all households were made up of individuals, and 9.4% had someone living alone who was 65 years of age or older. The average household size was 2.45 and the average family size was 2.93.

2000
As of the census of 2000, there were 112,818 people, 43,446 households, and 29,978 families residing within the MSA. The racial makeup of the MSA was 87.98% White, 0.99% African American, 6.79% Native American, 0.82% Asian, 0.06% Pacific Islander, 0.67% from other races, and 2.69% from two or more races. Hispanic or Latino of any race were 2.53% of the population.

The median income for a household in the MSA was $37,239, and the median income for a family was $42,667. Males had a median income of $28,590 versus $21,029 for females. The per capita income for the MSA was $18,309.

See also
South Dakota census statistical areas

References

 
Geography of Pennington County, South Dakota
Geography of Meade County, South Dakota